Wan Guchan (18 January 1900 – 19 November 1995) was a Chinese filmmaker. Born in Nanjing, Jiangsu, he was one of the Wan brothers who pioneered the Chinese animations industry.

Early history
Wan Guchan joined his twin brother Wan Laiming in most of the animation projects and experimentations.

Achievements
Throughout his career, Wan Guchan would be the closest to Wan Laiming in assisting him in all major projects. In 1958, he would be credited as the innovator of a new paper-cut method. The technique was demonstrated in the animation Pigsy Eats Watermelon.

Wan Guchan would also take part in the 1964 film Havoc in Heaven, which would bring China recognition internationally.

Filmography
Renshen Wawa (1962)
Jinse de hailuo (1963)

References

External links
 China Movie DB

1900 births
1995 deaths
Chinese animated film directors
Film directors from Jiangsu
20th-century Chinese inventors
Cinema pioneers
Artists from Nanjing
Chinese twins